George Adams Bright (1837–1905) was a United States Navy officer and surgeon, who retired with the rank of Rear Admiral.  He was Medical Director of the US Navy and head of the Naval Hospital in Washington, D.C.

Born in Bangor, Maine, Bright was a graduate of the Harvard Medical School (class of 1858).  He joined the navy at the outbreak of the American Civil War in 1861 and served as naval surgeon on board the USS South Carolina (1860) during its blockade of southern ports. He retired from the navy in 1899.  Bright is buried at Arlington National Cemetery in Washington, D.C.

References

People from Bangor, Maine
United States Navy rear admirals
Harvard Medical School alumni
Union Navy officers
1837 births
1905 deaths
United States Navy Medical Corps officers